The sulfur–iodine cycle (S–I cycle) is a three-step thermochemical cycle used to produce hydrogen.

The S–I cycle consists of three chemical reactions whose net reactant is water and whose net products are hydrogen and oxygen. All other chemicals are recycled. The S–I process requires an efficient source of heat.

Process description

The three reactions that produce hydrogen are as follows:
I2 + SO2 + 2 H2O  2 HI + H2SO4; Bunsen reaction
The HI is then separated by distillation or liquid/liquid gravitic separation.
2 H2SO4  2 SO2 + 2 H2O + O2
The water, SO2 and residual H2SO4 must be separated from the oxygen byproduct by condensation.
2 HI   I2 + H2
Iodine and any accompanying water or SO2 are separated by condensation, and the hydrogen product remains as a gas.

 Net reaction: 2 H2O → 2 H2 + O2

The sulfur and iodine compounds are recovered and reused, hence the consideration of the process as a cycle. This S–I process is a chemical heat engine. Heat enters the cycle in high-temperature endothermic chemical reactions 2 and 3, and heat exits the cycle in the low-temperature exothermic reaction 1. The difference between the heat entering and leaving the cycle exits the cycle in the form of the heat of combustion of the hydrogen produced.

Characteristics

Advantages
 All fluid (liquids, gases) process, therefore well suited for continuous production
 High thermal efficiency predicted (about 50%)
 Completely closed system without byproducts or effluents (besides hydrogen and oxygen)
 Suitable for application with solar, nuclear, and hybrid (e.g., solar-fossil) sources of heat - if high enough temperatures can be achieved
 More developed than competing thermochemical processes
 Scalable from relatively small scale to huge applications
 No need for expensive or toxic catalysts or additives
 More efficient than electrolysis of water (~70-80% efficiency) using electricity derived from a thermal power plant (~30-60% efficiency) combining to ~21-48% efficiency
 Waste heat suitable for district heating if cogeneration is desired

Disadvantages
 Very high temperatures required (at least ) - unachievable or difficult to achieve with current pressurized water reactors or concentrated solar power
 Corrosive reagents used as intermediaries (iodine, sulfur dioxide, hydriodic acid, sulfuric acid); therefore, advanced materials needed for construction of process apparatus
 Significant further development required to be feasible on large scale
 At the proposed temperature range advanced thermal power plants can achieve efficiencies (electric output per heat input) in excess of 50% somewhat negating the efficiency advantage
 In case of leakage corrosive and somewhat toxic substances are released to the environment - among them volatile iodine and hydroiodic acid
 If hydrogen is to be used for process heat the required high temperatures make the benefits compared to direct utilization of heat questionable
 Unable to use non-thermal or low-grade thermal energy sources such as hydropower, wind power or most currently available geothermal power

Research
The S–I cycle was invented at General Atomics in the 1970s.
The Japan Atomic Energy Agency (JAEA) has conducted successful experiments with the S–I cycle in the Helium cooled High Temperature Test Reactor, a reactor which reached first criticality in 1998, JAEA have the aspiration of using further nuclear very high-temperature generation IV reactors (VHTR) to produce industrial scale quantities of hydrogen. (The Japanese refer to the cycle as the IS cycle.) Plans have been made to test larger-scale automated systems for hydrogen production. Under an International Nuclear Energy Research Initiative (INERI) agreement, the French CEA, General Atomics and Sandia National Laboratories are jointly developing the sulfur-iodine process. Additional research is taking place at the Idaho National Laboratory, in Canada, Korea and Italy.

Material challenge
The selection of materials with sufficient corrosion resistance under the process conditions is of key importance to the economic viability of this process. The materials suggested include the following classes: refractory metals, reactive metals, superalloys, ceramics, polymers, and coatings.
Some materials suggested include tantalum alloys, niobium alloys, noble metals, high-silicon steels, several nickel-based superalloys, mullite, silicon carbide (SiC), glass, silicon nitride (Si3N4), and others. Recent research on scaled prototyping suggests that new tantalum surface technologies may be a technically and economically feasible way to make larger scale installations.

Hydrogen economy

The sulfur-iodine cycle has been proposed as a way to supply hydrogen for a hydrogen-based economy. It does not require hydrocarbons like current methods of steam reforming but requires heat from combustion, nuclear reactions, or solar heat concentrators.

See also
Cerium(IV) oxide–cerium(III) oxide cycle
Copper–chlorine cycle
Hybrid sulfur cycle
High-temperature electrolysis
Iron oxide cycle
Zinc–zinc oxide cycle

Footnotes

References
 Paul M. Mathias and Lloyd C. Brown "Thermodynamics of the Sulfur-Iodine Cycle for Thermochemical Hydrogen Production", presented at the 68 th Annual Meeting of the Society of Chemical Engineers, Japan 23 March 2003. (PDF).
 Atsuhiko TERADA; Jin IWATSUKI, Shuichi ISHIKURA, Hiroki NOGUCHI, Shinji KUBO, Hiroyuki OKUDA, Seiji KASAHARA, Nobuyuki TANAKA, Hiroyuki OTA, Kaoru ONUKI and Ryutaro HINO, "Development of Hydrogen Production Technology by Thermochemical Water Splitting IS Process Pilot Test Plan", Journal of Nuclear Science and Technology, Vol.44, No.3, p. 477–482 (2007). (PDF).

External links
 Hydrogen: Our Future made with Nuclear (in MPR Profile issue 9)
 Use of the modular helium reactor for hydrogen production (World Nuclear Association Symposium 2003)

Chemical reactions
Hydrogen production